Astartea arbuscula, commonly known as minute astartea, is a shrub endemic to Western Australia.

Description
It blooms between January and March producing white-pink flowers.

Distribution
It is found along the south coast on flats, plains, seasonal wetlands and valley floors in the Great Southern and South West regions of Western Australia where it grows in sandy-clay-peaty soils.

References

Eudicots of Western Australia
arbuscula
Endemic flora of Western Australia
Plants described in 1867
Taxa named by Barbara Lynette Rye